In mathematics, the Goldbach–Euler theorem (also known as Goldbach's theorem), states that the sum of 1/(p − 1) over the set of perfect powers p, excluding 1 and omitting repetitions, converges to 1:

This result was first published in Euler's 1737 paper "Variæ observationes circa series infinitas". Euler attributed the result to a letter (now lost) from Goldbach.

Proof

Goldbach's original proof to Euler involved assigning a constant to the harmonic series:
, which is divergent. Such a proof is not considered rigorous by modern standards. There is a strong resemblance between the method of sieving out powers employed in his proof and the method of factorization used to derive Euler's product formula for the Riemann zeta function.

Let x be given by

Repeat the process with the terms with the powers of three: 

Absent from the above sum are now all terms with powers of two and three. Continue by removing terms with powers of 5, 6 and so on until the right side is exhausted to the value of 1. Eventually, we obtain the equation

which we rearrange into

where the denominators consist of all positive integers that are the non-powers minus one. By subtracting the previous equation from the definition of x given above, we obtain

where the denominators now consist only of perfect powers minus one.

While lacking mathematical rigor, Goldbach's proof provides a reasonably intuitive argument for the theorem's truth. Rigorous proofs require proper and more careful treatment of the divergent terms of the harmonic series. Other proofs make use of the fact that the sum of 1/p over the set of perfect powers p, excluding 1 but including repetitions, converges to 1 by demonstrating the equivalence:

See also
 Goldbach's conjecture
 List of sums of reciprocals

References

 .
 

Theorems in analysis
Mathematical series
Articles containing proofs